Winter Story 2006–2007 is the third Winter Story album of South Korean boy band Shinhwa. It was released on 25 January 2007 by Good Entertainment. Shinhwa did not release a Winter Story for 2005-2006.   They released two different kinds of Winter Story 2006-2007, one containing 2 disc with the other containing 2 discs and a DVD.

Tracks
Information is adapted from the liner notes of Winter Story 2006-2007:

Chart performance

Release history

Personnel
Information is adapted from the liner notes of Winter Story 2006-2007:
 Park Kwon-young - producer
 Park Hyeok - sound engineer
 Jeon Hoon - mastering engineer
 Lee Seong-yeol - guitar ("Isn't It Beautiful", "The Days")
 Gil Eun-kyeong - piano ("The Days")
 Jang Joon-ho - piano ("The Days")
 Kang Soo-ho - drums ("The Days")
 The Strings - strings ("Isn't It Beautiful")
 K Strings - strings ("The Days")

References

Shinhwa albums
2007 compilation albums
2007 video albums